Vaçe Zela (7 April 19396 February 2014) was an Albanian singer and songwriter. She was a leading figure in the music industry and is considered one of the most influential musicians of the 20th century in Albania, Kosovo and Macedonia.
 
Born in Lushnjë and raised in Tirana within Communist Albania, she developed a great interest in music at an early age before embarking on a professional career as a musician in 1962. An eleven-time winner, she built her reputation as a highly successful musician by winning the first edition of Festivali i Këngës as well as her future victories in the festival.
 
Zela is a recipient of significant awards and decorations. She was awarded the Merited Artist Order, People's Artist Order and Honor of Nation Order.

Life 

Vaçe Zela was born on 7 April 1939 in the city of Lushnjë, then part of the Kingdom of Albania, into an Albanian family, as she herself said, in which music was "sitting cross-legged in everyone's soul".

Career

First appearances 

The first to discover Zela's talents were her school teachers. She was not only talented in music, but also in painting and theater. Zela was only ten years old when she began to sing folk songs from the Myzeqe region. She would often casually sing in her city of Lushnje's parks, attracting the passersby. Soon she would participate in small concerts organized in the city, although her parents did not like much the idea that their daughter took such a path. Nevertheless, she went to Tirana to compete in order to study at the prestigious School of Arts, but was not accepted, and attended Qemal Stafa High School, where she began to learn the guitar.
 
Zela was first appointed in the Army's Ensemble, then in the State's Ensemble, and finally the Ensemble of Songs and Dances.

Awards 

Zela was the first winner of the first Songs Festival in Albania with the song "First Child" on 26 December 1962. International awards include "Golden Disk", "Woman of the year" in Cambridge, England for '97-'98, "Golden Microphone" from the Ministry of Culture of Kosovo, etc. The latest award was "Special Grand Prize for Singing Legend", the 45th anniversary of the Festival at ART, for the singer's unique contribution to Albanian music, and participation since the very first years of this festival, during which she received many awards.

References

Sources

External links 

 

1939 births
2014 deaths
People from Lushnjë
Albanian guitarists
Albanian songwriters
20th-century Albanian women singers
Qemal Stafa High School alumni
Festivali i Këngës winners
Merited Artists of Albania
People's Artists of Albania
21st-century Albanian women singers
20th-century women guitarists
21st-century women guitarists